Adam Austin may refer to:

A pseudonym for the American comic book artist, Gene Colan (1926–2011)
Adam Austin (referee) (1911–1970), Scottish rugby union international referee